Alicia + Keys World Tour was the sixth concert tour by American singer and songwriter Alicia Keys in support of her seventh and eighth studio albums Alicia (2020) and Keys (2021). This is Keys' first global tour since her 2013 Set the World on Fire Tour. The European leg of the tour was supposed to begin on June 5, 2020 in Dublin, Ireland and conclude on July 20, 2020 in Krakow, Poland. The North American leg was supposed to run from July 28 through September 22, 2020, concluding in Miami, Florida.

Background
Keys announced the tour on January 21, 2020 along with the release date of her seventh studio album Alicia. The tour is Alicia Keys’ first world concert tour in seven years, with her last world tour being her Set the World on Fire Tour in 2013. American Express card holders in select markets in Europe and North America were able to purchase tickets on pre-sale. Tickets for several engagements sold out, prompting additional dates to be added to the tour.

Critical reception
For the concert at the AO Arena in Manchester, Louisa Gregson from Manchester Evening News wrote that Keys "deliver[ed] a slick but highly charged performance" and her "range and tone was as soulful as ever, enough to give goose bumps, enough to transport you mentally to her part of the world". Adam Davidson from Clash, who reviewed The O2 Arena concert in London, wrote that the concert “encapsulated why she is one of the great talents of modern music” and without many brakes in the concert, Keys “managed to hit all the difficult notes right to the end and was on top form throughout". He further commented that Keys “can do it all: sing, play piano, DJ and most importantly put on an incredible spectacle for her fans”. 

Gary Graff from The Oakland Press wrote that Keys “deftly blended musical substance with visual style and just a bit of schtick, but with a grounded earthiness and intimacy that’s often missing from the spectacles of her pop and soul peers”. In her review of the Jacobs Pavilion concert in Cleveland, Annie Nickoloff from Cleveland.com noted that “Keys instantly commanded the crowd before she sang a note or struck a single piano key” and further commented that Keys “regularly sat at the piano, showing off her prowess of the instrument, meshing her performance with her talented backing band to create soulful, jazz-tinged textures”. For the concert at the Huntington Bank Pavilion, Eloise Marie Valadez from The Times of Northwest Indiana wrote that "Keys kept the audience's attention with her impeccable vocals and exceptional keyboard playing" and performed a "fascinating segment" of original and unlocked versions of songs. In his review of the Smart Financial Centre concert, Douglas Devaughn from Houston Press noted that "Her show is almost two hours of hits" and concluded that "while Alicia has been gone from the major tour circuit for almost a decade, she hasn’t lost a step". Reviewing Keys’ concert at Seminole Hard Rock Tampa Event Center in Tampa, Maggie Duffy from Tampa Bay Times wrote that Keys “connected with the audience throughout her intimate concert” and “went on to deliver an outstanding live performance that cemented her as one of the greatest musicians and singers of all time”.

Opening acts

 Pink Sweats
 Lous and the Yakuza
 JP Saxe
 D Smoke
 Mereba
 Natalie Hemby
 Ayliva
 Belen Aguilera

Set list

European setlist

 "Nat King Cole"
 "Truth Without Love"
 "You Don't Know My Name"
 "Wasted Energy"
 "Time Machine"
 "Karma"
 "Un-Thinkable (I'm Ready)"
 "So Done"
 "3 Hour Drive"
 "Show Me Love"
 "Diary"
 "The Gospel" / "Plentiful" / "Nobody"
 "Skydive"
 "Is It Insane"
 "Only You"
 "Authors of Forever"
 "Unbreakable"
 "My Boo"
 "City of Gods (Part II)"
 "Empire State of Mind (Part II) Broken Down"
 "Try Sleeping With a Broken Heart"
 "Girl on Fire"
 "Superwoman"
 "Dead End Road"
 "Fallin'"
 "In Common" (Black Coffee Remix)
 "Gypsy Woman (She's Homeless)"
 "Underdog"
 "No One"

Encore
 "Like You'll Never See Me Again
 "If I Ain't Got You"

US setlist 
This set list is representative of the concert in Tampa on September 18, 2022. It does not represent all concerts for the tour.

 "Nat King Cole"
 "You Don't Know My Name"
 "Wasted Energy"
 "Karma"
 "New Day"
 "Un-Thinkable (I'm Ready)"
 "Diary"
 "The Gospel"
 "Plentiful"
 "Nobody"
 "Skydive"
 "Is It Insane"
 "Only You"
 "A Woman's Worth"
 "Unbreakable"
 "My Boo"
 "City of Gods (Part II)"
 "Empire State of Mind (Part II) Broken Down"
 "Try Sleeping With a Broken Heart"
 "Girl on Fire"
 "Superwoman"
 "Fallin'"
 "In Common" (Black Coffee Remix)
 "Underdog"
 "No One"
 "If I Ain't Got You"

Notes
 In Manchester, Keys performed "This Charming Man" by The Smiths with Johnny Marr.
 During the show in London, Keys invited Mahalia on stage to perform "Show Me Love", Sampha to perform "3 Hour Drive" and Jorja Smith to perform "On My Mind".
 In Paris, Keys performed "Djadja" with Aya Nakamura.  
 Following the show in Floirac France, "Authors of Forever" was removed from the setlist while "New Day" was added. 
 In Luxembourg, Keys performed "Billions" live for the first time.
 "A Woman's Worth" was performed during the show in Atlanta  as well as "A Beautiful Noise" alongside Brandi Carlile. Keys was later joined by Stacey Abrams during "Superwoman" to encourage voting in the upcoming elections.
In Nashville, Keys performed "Jill Scott" and "The Way" with Jill Scott.

Tour dates

Cancellations

Rescheduled concerts

References

2022 concert tours
Alicia Keys concert tours